Nicholas Julian Whalen  (born June 6, 1973) is a Canadian Liberal politician, who represented the riding of St. John's East in the House of Commons of Canada from 2015 until 2019. Whalen was defeated in the 2019 federal election by former New Democratic MP Jack Harris in a rematch of the 2015 election.

Early life and career 
Whalen's father, Norman Whalen, was president of the Newfoundland and Labrador Liberal Party in the 1980s, and managed Clyde Wells' 1989 election victory.

He attended Queen's University's engineering school, earning both undergraduate and graduate degrees in the field. He then earned an LLB degree in 2001 from the McGill University Faculty of Law.

Whalen practised law at the law firm McInnes Cooper, specializing in energy law, intellectual property, and corporate and commercial law.  He was also, at the time of his election, the only qualified patent agent, and worked with a number of charitable organizations.  He had previously served as the local Liberal Party treasurer.

Federal politics
Whalen's election in St. John's East over the popular NDP incumbent, Jack Harris, was considered one of the biggest surprises of the 2015 federal election.

In October 2016, Whalen responded to comments over Twitter by Earle McCurdy about the protests opposing the Lower Churchill Project over concerns of methylmercury being spilled into Lake Melville. Whalen responded by tweeting that the methylmercury levels should be monitored and people should compensate when levels are high by eating less fish. Whalen later issued an apology for that comment.

Whalen was defeated in the 2019 federal election.

Electoral record

References

Living people
Liberal Party of Canada MPs
Members of the House of Commons of Canada from Newfoundland and Labrador
Lawyers in Newfoundland and Labrador
Politicians from St. John's, Newfoundland and Labrador
Queen's University at Kingston alumni
Intellectual property lawyers
Patent attorneys
Canadian engineers
1973 births
21st-century Canadian politicians
McGill University Faculty of Law alumni